The Range is a multi-channel retailer selling products in the home, garden, and leisure categories, with over 180 stores in the United Kingdom & Ireland.

History 
In 1980, Chris Dawson started business as an open-air market trader in Plymouth, South West England.

His first physical retail store opened in 1989 at Sugar Mill Business Park on Billacombe Road, Plymouth under the name "C.D.S. Superstores". This trading style continues to be displayed on external signage exclusively at this debut store only, as a nod to the heritage of the business.

The business was subsequently re-branded "The Range" in the early 1990s after further store openings. "The Range" is the trading name of CDS (Superstores International) Ltd.

Controversy 
On 12 May 2021, Trustpilot investigates The Range over ‘incentives for reviews’. The investigation comes after The Grocer highlighted to Trustpilot a flurry of recent five-star reviews of the business.

During the Covid 19 pandemic in 2021, The Range was called upon to repay millions of pounds of taxpayer money which it had saved by keeping its stores open during lockdown. The funds are expected to be valued at 36 million and attained via the Government's 'Business Rates Holiday'. The Range claims that it is keeping the money to invest in the company and not follow suit in handing it back like their larger rivals B&M and Tesco. The Range is under no legal obligation to repay the money, but the company's latest financial statement says trading has been strong through the pandemic and it expects to see 'significant growth' in 2021, with healthy cash reserves.

Key people 
Chris Dawson, the founder of the business, was Chief Executive Officer between 1989 and 2017.

Jersey based Sarah Dawson wholly owns the parent companies shares with her husband Chris Dawson listed as a person with significant control.

Chris Dawson was ranked fifth in Management Today's seventh annual survey of Britain's Top 100 Entrepreneurs.

Products 
The Range sells a diverse and large assortment of products, their marketing often referencing a product range of over 65,000 products. Products sold are a combination of branded, non-branded, and own-branded goods in the broad home, garden and leisure categories.

Store growth 
The Range has expanded rapidly. In 2009, The Range was ranked 121st on The Sunday Times, PricewaterhouseCoopers Top Track, and 250 League Table of the United Kingdom's fastest growing companies.

The business regularly announces new store openings in large tranches, for example in November 2013, it was announced that The Range planned to open 40 stores in the period of 2013 to 2016.  New store openings such as the Swansea store regularly gain local press attention.

Many of the stores in Ireland are repurposed stores/retail warehouses that have been left by other brands including Woolworths, Tesco, Homebase and Atlantic Homecare

During 2016 and 2017, The Range opened stores in both Northern Ireland and the Republic of Ireland for the first time. Chris Dawson, the chain's billionaire owner has previously indicated he has European expansion plans, including 1,000 stores across Europe. The retailer currently operates a total of 176 stores, including a brand new concept store in Derriford, Plymouth.

The Range have also expanded e-commerce operations significantly in recent years. The business was recognised in 2017 as a leading multi-channel retailer in the Internet Retailing UK Top 250 and the EU Top 350 indices.

Store formats & locations 
The vast majority of stores are situated in out-of-town retail park locations, with some exceptions such as the four Greater London stores at Surrey Quays, Enfield, Romford and Watford. The Range also occupies some shopping centre locations such as the Redditch store. Various design iterations of the store branding and format have been used as the brand has evolved. Stores are geographically dispersed across all regions of the United Kingdom & the Republic of Ireland.

Many stores also include a "Dee Dee's", an own-brand coffee shop concept operated by Compass Group and found only within The Range stores. Newer, larger stores offer an Iceland food department (paid for at main tills), and the cafes in stores with Iceland are branded 'Iceland Cafe'. Some stores also host concessions such as rug cleaner hire or key cutting services.

Distribution centres 
The Range operates over 2,000,000 sq ft of distribution space, mostly from their facilities at Avonmouth, Bristol and Thorne, Doncaster.

The Avonmouth distribution centre has an area of over 1,250,000 sq ft and is the largest single footprint warehouse in the United Kingdom.

The Thorne distribution centre has an area of over 750,000 sq ft.

Head office 
The Range Head Office used to be in the Estover area of Plymouth, but in 2019 it was relocated to a new building named ‘Elsie Margaret House’ . It is in the Derriford area of Plymouth next door to the flagship store. It employs over 300 people.

The new head office was part of a major development by London-based property developer Petros and was set to include residential, retail, hospitality, and office space. Dawson has indicated a long-held ambition to commit The Range to a long-term future and its head office jobs to Plymouth, the city where he has lived most of his life.

References

External links 
 

Arts and crafts retailers
British companies established in 1989
Retail companies established in 1989
1989 establishments in the United Kingdom
Garden centres
British brands
Home improvement companies of the United Kingdom
Retail companies of the United Kingdom
Discount shops of the United Kingdom
Companies based in Plymouth, Devon